Casey Sanchez is an American journalist who writes about race and poverty issues. He is a staff writer for the Southern Poverty Law Center's monthly newsletter, the Intelligence Report. His articles appear in national magazines which cover racism, including The American Prospect, The Chicago Reporter and the Village Voice.

Education
Sanchez has a Bachelor of Arts degree in humanities from the University of Chicago.

Career
Sanchez began his career as an editor of Extra, a Latino newspaper based in Chicago. From July 2005 to March 2007 he worked as a reporter for The Chicago Reporter.

He is currently a staff writer for the Southern Poverty Law Center's monthly newsletter, the Intelligence Report.

Awards
Finalist, 2006 IRE Awards — for two articles, entitled "Dumping grounds" and "Six more years", published in The Chicago Reporter
Second place, 2007 Green Eyeshade Excellence in Journalism Awards — for an article entitled "Southern Gothic", published in the Intelligence Report

References

American male journalists
University of Chicago alumni
Living people
Year of birth missing (living people)